Ambrosio Echebarría Arroita (22 April 1922 – 6 December 2010) was the Roman Catholic bishop of the Roman Catholic Diocese of Barbastro-Monzón, Spain.

Ordained in 1947, Echebarría Arroita was named bishop of the diocese in 1974 and retired in 1999.

Notes

20th-century Roman Catholic bishops in Spain
1922 births
2010 deaths